How (stylized as HOW) is a 2D platform game for Microsoft Windows. It was released in 2012 as freeware by Danish video game developer Michael Jensen. It has high difficulty level which includes unexpected traps.

Gameplay
The game plays like any standard 2D platform game in which the player can move the main character, Foxy McBox, through the level with the arrow keys and jump, but unlike in most games of its genre, the character cannot be controlled once in mid-air and will need forward momentum in order to jump in any direction, making it very difficult to make it through even some of the earliest stages.

Instead of following a preset path, players have the choice of taking on the levels in any order they want, something that can be used to the player's advantage by, for example, avoiding very difficult levels.

Development
The developer decided to start creating the game after complaining across several game developer forums about the "extreme hand-holding of the player" in current generation games and as such he set out to create a game that would be brutally unfair to the player.

By collecting some feedback on the Unreal Tournament 3 forums (on which he was an active participant as a modder) Jensen gathered what made players angry about a game and used it to create levels in HOW that abuse all of those things, but make sure that players fault their own lack of skill rather than the game being impossible.

In the official blog for HOW as well as on its Facebook page, Jensen claims that he wants to see players feel the frustration that was common in older games, and commented on his dislike of children thinking themselves to be tough for having beaten games that he considers too easy.

Originally the characters had a very detailed look to them. Jensen posted on the Facebook page of the game several early sketches of the game's characters and game logo (originally "Tophatten", or Top Hat in English). However, according to Jensen's Twitter account he gave up on the complex character design due to his lack of animation skills, sticking instead to an extremely blocky version of Foxy McBox, something that ended up adding to the difficulty of the game.

Jensen finally released the game on April 29, 2012, with an update with several bug fixes and a few more levels coming two weeks later.

Reception
Many players have reflected their frustration at the punishing of the game. One of the most repeated complaints is the fact that when players die they lose all progress in the game, no matter how many levels they have cleared. To this, Michael Jensen replied in his blog that the game allows players to tackle each level in whatever order they want, and that players should use that to their advantage, finishing first those levels they are most likely to die in.

Politiken journalist Thomas Vigild said that Jensen “really succeeds in conveying his message that games these days are too easy and he does it with aggression”.

Several videos of users playing the game and showing their anger at it have been uploaded to YouTube since the game's release.

Swedish indie developer Nicklas Nygren gave a speech during Nordic Game Indie Night in May 2012 where he called the game "the one he hates the most". His speech caused a surge of interest in the game but also started an enmity with Jensen. Furthermore, when working as a game development teacher at Vallekilde Folk High School, Nicklas frequently uses HOW as an example of how not to design a video game.

References

2012 video games
Freeware games
Platform games
Video games developed in Denmark
Windows games
Windows-only games
Indie video games
Single-player video games